Suleyman Fakhriyovych Seytkhalilov (born 14 February 2002) is a Ukrainian professional footballer who plays as a midfielder for Hirnyk-Sport Horishni Plavni.

Career
Born in Crimea, Seytkhalilov is a product of the Dnipro, Knyazha and Zirka youth sportive school systems.

In August 2020 he was transferred to the Premier League debutant FC Inhulets Petrove and made his debut in the Ukrainian Premier League on 21 February 2021, playing as the second half-time substituted player in a home drawing match against FC Vorskla Poltava.

References

External links 
 
 

2002 births
Living people
People from Yevpatoria
Ukrainian footballers
Association football midfielders
FC Inhulets Petrove players
FC Kremin Kremenchuk players
FC Hirnyk-Sport Horishni Plavni players
Ukrainian Premier League players
Ukrainian First League players